Hyla zhaopingensis is a species of frogs in the family Hylidae endemic to China.
Its natural habitats are subtropical or tropical moist lowland forests, swamps, freshwater marshes, intermittent freshwater marshes, arable land, plantations, rural gardens, heavily degraded former forests, ponds, and irrigated land. It is threatened by habitat loss.

Sources

Hyla
Amphibians described in 1984
Taxonomy articles created by Polbot